The AN/ARC-34 is a UHF aircraft radio transceiver that was used in many U.S. aircraft of the 1950s and 1960s, such as the A-37, B-52, B-57, F-5, F-86, F-100, F-101, F-102, C-130, C-135, C-137, C-140, CH-3, H-43, H-53, T-38, T-39 and U-2.

System Description
The ARC-34 was a military UHF AM radio that operated between 225.0-399.9 MHz and transmitted at 8 watts. It featured a separate guard receiver for monitoring 243 MHz, while simultaneously monitoring the active channel selected.  The unit was unpressurized, but a pressurized version, designated AN/ARC-133, could operate at altitudes up to 50,000 feet.  The radio system was designed by RCA, but some models were built by Magnavox.

See also
List of military electronics of the United States

References

External links
 AN/ARC Technical Manual
U.S. Military Equipment

Equipment of the United States Air Force
Military radio systems of the United States
Military electronics of the United States
Goods manufactured in the United States
Aircraft stations
Military equipment introduced in the 1950s